The NWA Florida Women's Championship was a women's professional wrestling title in Championship Wrestling from Florida, which lasted originally from 1951 to at least 1971.

Title history

Footnotes

References

See also
Championship Wrestling from Florida
National Wrestling Alliance

Championship Wrestling from Florida championships
National Wrestling Alliance championships
Women's professional wrestling championships
Professional wrestling in Florida
Women's sports in Florida
National Wrestling Alliance state wrestling championships